Albert 'Alf' Somerfield (23 March 1918 – March 1985) was an English professional footballer who played as a centre forward in the Football League for Crystal Palace and made guest appearances for Ipswich Town He began his career at Frickley Colliery but the outbreak of war interrupted his professional career.

References

1918 births
1985 deaths
People from South Kirkby
English footballers
Association football forwards
Frickley Athletic F.C. players
Mansfield Town F.C. players
Wolverhampton Wanderers F.C. players
Ipswich Town F.C. wartime guest players
Clapton Orient F.C. wartime guest players
Chelmsford City F.C. players
Wrexham A.F.C. players
Crystal Palace F.C. players
Worcester City F.C. players
Kidderminster Harriers F.C. players
English Football League players